Janae or janae may refer to:

People
Janae Bakken
Janae Marie Kroc
Janae Timmins
Janae Watson

Science
Acarospora janae
Dolichupis janae
Pareuxoa janae
Squalius janae